Swordsmen from the Stars is a collection of sword and planet science fantasy short stories by American author Poul Anderson. It was first published in trade paperback and ebook by DMR Books in April 2020.

Summary
The book collects three short works of fiction by the author featuring adventure on alien worlds (and in one instance, Earth) of the far future that have reverted to barbarism.

Contents
"Witch of the Demon Seas" (from Planet Stories, Jan. 1951).
"The Virgin of Valkarion" (from Planet Stories, Jul. 1951). 
"Swordsman of Lost Terra" (from Planet Stories, Nov. 1951).

References

2020 short story collections
Science fiction short story collections
Fantasy short story collections
Short story collections by Poul Anderson
DMR Books books